Pathar Masjid (Thanesar) is a mosque build of red sandstone in Mughal architecture style. The fluted minarets are attached to the back walls. Believed to be built in 17th century, the mosque is located in Thanesar (Kurukshetra district) and is protected by the Government of India. The ceiling that rests on pillars is decorated by carved floral designs. It is situated near the tomb of Sheikh Chilli.

History 
The mosque was built during the reign of Jahangir.

Description 
It is a small building made out of red sandstone.

See also 

 Pathar Mosque (Srinagar)

References 

Mughal mosques
Mosques in Haryana
Tourist attractions in Kurukshetra district